X-Men: Apocalypse vs. Dracula is a four-issue comic book limited series published in 2006 by Marvel Comics. The series was written by Frank Tieri and drawn by Clayton Henry.

Plot
One, Apocalypse, is a villain that has been plaguing civilization since the time of the Pharaohs. The other, Dracula, is the deadliest vampire to ever walk the earth. The story tells how centuries ago, before his vampire days, Vlad Tepes lost in battle against the ageless mutant, Apocalypse. Now in the days of 19th-century London, Dracula is seeking revenge for his past defeat and is turning members of Apocalypse's clan into vampires. Apocalypse himself is awoken from his slumber to take battle against the Lord of Vampires, and with Abraham Van Helsing at his side.<ref>X-Men: Apocalypse vs. Dracula #1-4</ref>

Collected editions
The series has been collected into a trade paperback:X-Men: Apocalypse / Dracula'' (96 pages, October 2006 )

See also
 2006 in comics

References

External links
 X-Men: Apocalypse/Dracula at the Comic Book DB

X-Men titles
Apocalypse vs. Dracula
2006 comics debuts
2006 comics endings
Horror comics
Comics set in the 15th century
Comics set in the 19th century
Comics based on Dracula
Comics set in Romania
Vampires in comics
Comics set in the United Kingdom